The Jardin botanique montagnard (2 hectares), also known as the Jardin botanique du Mazet-Saint-Voy, is a municipal botanical garden located in Mazet-Saint-Voy, Haute-Loire, Auvergne, France. The garden was established in 1987, and now contains about 450 regionally threatened plant species, as well as 6 additional species protected in the Haute-Loire and 8 species listed nationally for protection.

See also 
 List of botanical gardens in France

References 
 Mazet-Saint-Voy
 Convention on Biological Diversity: Botanical gardens in France
 BGCI entry
 Aujardin entry, with photographs
  Christian Grosclaude, Jardin botanique du Mazet : flore de l'étage montagnard : guide du visiteur, Association Environnement et Patrimoine du Mazet, 2002. 

Montagnard, Jardin botanique
Montagnard, Jardin botanique